This is a list of airports in Cyprus, grouped by type and sorted by location.



Airports

See also 
 Transport in Cyprus
 Cyprus dispute
 List of airports by ICAO code: L#LC – Cyprus
 Wikipedia: Airline destination lists: Europe#Cyprus
 Highway_strip#Examples

References

Citations 

 
 
  – includes IATA codes
  – ICAO and IATA codes

Bibliography 

Cyprus
 
Airports
Airports
Cyprus
Cyprus